Acestrorhynchus falcatus is a species of fish in the family Acestrorhynchidae. It was described by Marcus Elieser Bloch in 1794, originally under the genus Salmo. It inhabits the Orinoco and Amazon Rivers in the regions of Suriname, Guyana, and French Guiana.

Two shell valves that are not equal adhere to one another along the edges to form the ellipsoidal spore body. Each valve has a lengthy tail that is 20.5m in length. On its entire length, a uniform sheath encircled the tail. Three to four spirals of the arctic thread are contained in the 1.2 m polar capsules. A tightly adhering, uniform structural coating covered every surface of the immature and mature spores; it was predominantly thicker at the tails. Piscinoodinium pillulare was the major parasite for A. falcatus.

Acestrorhynchus falcatus feeds on finfish. It is of minor interest to commercial fisheries.

References

Acestrorhynchidae
Taxa named by Marcus Elieser Bloch 
Fish described in 1794